The Commission scolaire de langue française is a school district in Abram-Village, Prince Edward Island, Canada.

The Commission scolaire de langue française is a Francophone district operating 6 public schools (gr. 1–12) across the province. Current enrollment is approximately 673 students.  The Commission scolaire de langue française is headquartered in Abrams Village.

The Commission scolaire de langue française was created in the 1990s when Regional School Unit 5 was renamed and its mandate extended province-wide.

Évangéline Family
 École Évangéline
 École-sur-Mer
 École Pierre-Chiasson

François-Buote Family
 École François-Buote
 École St-Augustin

La-Belle-Cloche Family
 École La-Belle-Cloche

See also
List of schools in Prince Edward Island
List of school districts in Prince Edward Island
Holland College
University of Prince Edward Island

External links
 

Education in Kings County, Prince Edward Island
Education in Prince County, Prince Edward Island
Education in Queens County, Prince Edward Island
French-language school districts in Canada
School districts in Prince Edward Island